"Two Old Men" ("Два старика") is a short story by Leo Tolstoy written in 1885.  It is a religious piece that was translated to English by Leo Wiener in 1904.  According to Christianity Today, it is the story of Efim and Elisha, two neighbors who decide to make a pilgrimage to Jerusalem before dying.

Publication and Commentary

The story was retold in a sermon by Benedictine monk David Steindl-Rast, who concluded his retelling with, "Who really got the goal of pilgrimage?"  The story is included in numerous Tolstoy collections, such as "Twenty Three Tales" (1924) and "Leo Tolstoy's 20 Greatest Short Stories"'' (2009).

See also
Bibliography of Leo Tolstoy
Twenty-Three Tales

References

External links
 Original Text
 Two Old Men, from RevoltLib.com
 Two Old Men, from Marxists.org
 Two Old Men, from Archive.org

Short stories by Leo Tolstoy
1885 short stories